The Pinto Horse Association of America (PtHA) registers horses, utility horses, ponies and miniature horses of various pedigrees with certain kinds of pinto coat colors. The word pinto is Spanish for "paint." In general terms, pinto can apply to any horse marked with unpigmented pink-skinned, white-haired areas on its coat. The Pinto Horse Association of America provides the owners and riders of pintos with a show circuit and a breed organization. The primary requirement for PtHA registration is coat color; the pinto is not a true breed, but a color breed.

This registry is distinct from the American Paint Horse Association, which registers Paint horses. The Paint Horse is bred as a stock horse suitable for western riding, and comes from American Quarter Horse and Thoroughbred lineage. The Pinto Horse Association of America does not specialize solely in stock horse breeding, though some PtHA-registered horses are stock horses.  Most horses with the recognized color pattern registered by the American Paint Horse Association qualify for the PtHA as well, though the reverse is not true.

History
The Pinto Horse Association of America was formed in 1956 for "colored" horses. The aim of the association was to provide a competition venue for spotted horses and to track their pedigrees. The need for the organization arose in part due to the exclusion of horses with excessive white, called cropouts, from many traditional breed registries.  Many registries that have relaxed their regulations regarding coat color in recent years historically denied papers to some examples of the breed. Spotted horses also faced discrimination in the show ring, as solid coat colors were preferred.

Coat color requirements
To qualify for full registration with the Pinto Horse Association of America, a horse must exhibit a cumulative four square inches of white coat with underlying pink skin in the so-called "qualifying zone." The qualifying zone excludes the face from the ear to the corner of the mouth, and the corner of the mouth to the chin. The legs from the knee and hock down are also not part of the qualifying zone. Ponies must have a cumulative three square inches of pink-skinned white coat, and Miniature horses need to exhibit two square inches of such white coat.

Fully registered horses are divided into two categories: Tobiano and Overo. The application of these terms to PtHA Pinto horses is not based on genetics, but rather on a visual description. This may be because whether or not a pattern crosses the back affects how the topline is perceived visually, such as when horses are judged on their conformation. Horses that are labeled "tobiano" by the PtHA are described as having a coat that "appears to be white with large flowing spots of color, often overlapping. Spots of color typically originate from the head, chest, flank and buttock, often including the tail." This definition is largely accurate in describing the genetic condition of the tobiano spotting pattern.

The Pinto Horse Association of America's designation of "overo" also depends on a visual description: "a colored horse with white markings. Spots of white appear to be jagged and usually originate on the animal's side or belly spreading toward the neck, tail, legs and back. White almost never crosses the back." A variety of genetically distinct white spotting patterns produce coat colors that fit into the PtHA's "overo" category, including frame overo, which is associated with Lethal white syndrome. splashed white, sabino-type and Dominant white patterns also fit this description.

Horses which lack the minimum amount of white, but exhibit "Pinto characteristics" such as blue or parti-colored eyes, leg white above the knee or hock, white or multi-colored hooves and minimal body white may be registered as Breeding Stock. Solid white horses are also registered as Breeding Stock.

The non-white areas of the coat may be listed on PtHA papers as bay, bay roan, black, blue roan, brown, buckskin, chestnut, cremello, dun, gray, grulla, palomino, perlino, red dun, red roan, seal brown, silver dapple or sorrel.

Pedigree requirements and types
Registration with the Pinto Horse Association of America is primarily based on coat color. Miniature and pony stallions, mares, and geldings may be registered with undocumented parentage, as may horse mares and geldings. Horse stallions must have documented parentage including a sire and dam registered with the PtHA itself, or as one of the following breeds: American Paint Horse, Quarter Horse, Thoroughbred, Arabian horse, National Show Horse, Morgan horse, American Saddlebred, Standardbred horse, Missouri Fox Trotter, Tennessee Walking Horse, Andalusian horse, Lusitano, Hanoverian, Holsteiner, Trakehner, Westphalian, and Oldenburg.

No horses or ponies with draft horse ancestors or characteristics, or those of the Appaloosa breed (leopard complex) are permitted.

Pinto horses can be any of the major physical conformation types.  For competition purposes, horses and ponies registered with the PtHA are classified by their heights and their type. Animals which measure no more than 34 inches at the withers (8.2 hands high) are classified as "Miniature"; between 34 and 38 inches (8.2 to 9.2hh) as "Miniature B"; 38 to 56 inches (9.2 to 14hh) as "Pony" and anything exceeding 14 hands high at the withers fits into the PtHA's "Horse" category.

Stock-type Pintos are suitable for western riding, and are typically of American Quarter Horse or Paint breeding and conformation. Stock-type Pinto ponies are of predominantly Shetland pony, Welsh pony or Quarter Horse breeding.
Hunter-type Pintos are suitable for hunt seat or sport horse styles of English riding, and are predominantly of Thoroughbred or Warmblood breeding and conformation. Hunter-type Pinto ponies are of predominantly Welsh pony, Connemara pony, or Thoroughbred breeding.

Pleasure-type Pintos are suitable for pleasure riding and are typically of Arabian, Andalusian or Morgan breeding and conformation. Pleasure-type Pinto ponies are typically of Welsh pony, Classic Shetland pony or Arabian breeding.  Some of these animals, depending on aptitude, may cross over into the Saddle type category, particularly the National Show Horse.

Saddle-type Pinto ponies are predominantly of American Shetland, Hackney pony or American Saddlebred breeding.

Competitions
The original purpose of the Pinto Horse Association of America was to provide a competition venue for "colored" horses. Horse shows open only to horses registered with the Pinto Horse Association of America are held year-round and all across the United States. Pinto Horse Association shows offer a wide variety of classes in various disciplines, including western riding, saddle seat riding and driving, hunt seat riding, dressage, equitation, gymkhana, and rodeo events.

References

Equestrian organizations
Horse breed registries
Color breeds